Trescasas is a municipality located in the province of Segovia, Castile and León, Spain. According to the 2022 census (INE), the municipality has a population of 1090 inhabitants.

Geography

Location 
It borders to the north with Espirdo, Cabanillas del Monte and Torrecaballeros, to the south with Palazuelos de Eresma, to the east with the province of Madrid and to the west with La Lastrilla and San Cristóbal de Segovia.

Climate 
According to the Köppen climatic classification, Trescasas falls within the Csb variant, that is, a Mediterranean climate with oceanic influence, with mild and dry summers, with the mean of the warmest month not exceeding 22 °C.

References

External links 

 Ayuntamiento de Trescasas |

Municipalities in the Province of Segovia
Populated places in the Province of Segovia